Nkemdilim “Mary” Onyali-Omagbemi (née Onyali, born 3 February 1968) is a Nigerian former sprinter, she was a 5x Olympian 1988 - 2004. She had won the bronze medal in the 4 × 100 m relay at the 1992 Olympic Games and in the 200 m at the 1996 Olympic Games. She also won the 1994 Commonwealth Games 100 metres title.

Onyali-Omagbemi performed especially well in the All-Africa Games, winning a total of 7 individual medals in the short sprints. She won 100 m in 1991, 1995 and 2003 and took a bronze medal in 1987. Gold medals in 200 m were taken in 1987, 1995 and 2003. Furthermore, the Nigerian 4 × 100 m relay team won all races between 1987 and 2003, at the African Games.

Born Mary Onyali, by the time of the 2000 Olympics she was known as Mary Onyali-Omagbemi, having married fellow Nigerian sprinter Victor Omagbemi.

Her consecutive Olympic appearances from 1988 to 2004 made her the first Nigerian to compete at five Olympics. This feat was equalled by table tennis players Bose Kaffo and Segun Toriola four years later in Beijing, PR China.
Mary Onyali-Omagbemi currently serves as the Special Adviser (Technical) to the Director General of the National Sports Commission in Nigeria, and is a part of the consultation committee for the proposed Sports University of Nigeria, Idumuje-Ugboko.

On the 21st of September 2020, she was made one of the ambassadors of the re-branded National Principal's Cup; a grassroots championship tournament that was popular across Nigeria that discovered many talents, some who were former Super Eagles stars.

Achievements

Personal bests
100 metres - 10.97 (1993)
200 metres - 22.07 (1996)
400 metres - 54.21 (2000)

See also
List of sportspeople sanctioned for doping offences
List of athletes with the most appearances at Olympic Games

References

External links

1968 births
Living people
Doping cases in athletics
Nigerian female sprinters
Nigerian sportspeople in doping cases
Olympic athletes of Nigeria
Athletes (track and field) at the 1988 Summer Olympics
Athletes (track and field) at the 1992 Summer Olympics
Athletes (track and field) at the 1994 Commonwealth Games
Athletes (track and field) at the 1996 Summer Olympics
Athletes (track and field) at the 2000 Summer Olympics
Athletes (track and field) at the 2004 Summer Olympics
Olympic bronze medalists for Nigeria
Commonwealth Games gold medallists for Nigeria
Commonwealth Games silver medallists for Nigeria
Commonwealth Games medallists in athletics
Medalists at the 1996 Summer Olympics
Medalists at the 1992 Summer Olympics
Olympic bronze medalists in athletics (track and field)
African Games gold medalists for Nigeria
African Games medalists in athletics (track and field)
Universiade medalists in athletics (track and field)
Athletes (track and field) at the 1987 All-Africa Games
Athletes (track and field) at the 1991 All-Africa Games
Athletes (track and field) at the 1995 All-Africa Games
Athletes (track and field) at the 2003 All-Africa Games
Universiade silver medalists for Nigeria
Medalists at the 1987 Summer Universiade
Olympic female sprinters
20th-century Nigerian women
Medallists at the 1994 Commonwealth Games